The Kazakhstan Federation of Radiosport and Radio Amateur (Qazaqstannyń Radıosport jáne Radıoáýesqoı federatsııasy) is a national non-profit organization for amateur radio enthusiasts in Kazakhstan.  KFRR promotes amateur radio in Kazakhstan by sponsoring amateur radio operating awards and radio contests.  The KFRR organizes and supports Amateur Radio Direction Finding competitions and the Kazakhstan national ARDF team.  The KFRR also represents the interests of Kazakhstan amateur radio operators before Kazakhstan and international telecommunications regulatory authorities.  KFRR is the national member society representing Kazakhstan in the International Amateur Radio Union, which it joined on February 10, 2009.

References 

Kazakhstan
Clubs and societies in Kazakhstan
Radio in Kazakhstan
Organizations based in Astana